The Virtuous Thief is a lost 1919 American silent drama film directed by Fred Niblo.

Plot
As described in a film magazine, Dick Armitage (Hughes), essentially honest but weak, steals a small sum from his employer, Walter Haskell (Conklin), but confesses the theft prior to its discovery in hopes of leniency. Haskell asks him to sign a confession and gives him three days to raise the money, meanwhile discharging him. Dick is unable to raise the sum so his sister Shirley (Bennett) enters Haskell's employ as a stenographer to pay back the debt. Haskell becomes enamored of her and allows her marked attentions, to the dismay of Bobby Baker (Welch), also in Haskell's employ and Shirley's sweetheart. Matters reach a climax when Haskell attempts certain familiarities and is rebuffed. He then threatens the arrest of Dick unless Shirley bends to his will. She returns to the office at night to steal Dick's confession and is caught by Haskell. Mrs. Haskell (Matthews) has detectives watching her husband and they bring her to the scene. A woman who had lived upon Haskell's bounty also appears. The next morning Haskell is found dead in his office. Dick believes his sister is guilty and unsuccessfully attempts to take the blame. Mrs. Haskell arrives at the police headquarters and vindicates Shirley. The police later locate the murderess with happiness then following Dick, Shirley, and Bobbie.

Cast
 Enid Bennett as Shirley Armitage
 Niles Welch as Bobbie Baker
 Lloyd Hughes as Dick Armitage
 Willis Marks as Major Jefferson Armitage
 William Conklin as Walter Haskell
 Dorcas Matthews as Mrs. Haskell
 Lucille Young as Amie Renault
 Andrew Robson as Police Captain

References

External links

1919 films
1919 drama films
Silent American drama films
American silent feature films
American black-and-white films
Films directed by Fred Niblo
Lost American films
1919 lost films
Lost drama films
1910s American films